The 1993 Kazakhstan Cup Final was the second final of the Kazakhstan Cup. The match was contested by Dostyk and Taraz at Central Stadium in Almaty. The match was played on 8 November 1993 and was the final match of the competition.

Background
Dostyk played the first Kazakhstan Cup Final.

Taraz played the second Kazakhstan Cup Final. In the first final they lost Kairat with the score 5-1.

Dostyk and Taraz were played twice during the season of league. On May 20, 1993 they beat Taraz in the first game 2-1 at the Central stadium. On June 14, 1993 Dostyk won against Taraz with the score 3-1.

Route to the Final

Dostyk

Taraz

Match

Details

References

Kazakhstan Cup Finals
1993 domestic association football cups
1993 in Kazakhstani football